Yeşiller can refe to:

 Yeşiller, Orhaneli
 Green Party (Turkey)